Marijke Callebaut (born 11 August 1980) is a retired Belgian footballer. Callebaut was part of the Djurgården Swedish champions' team of 2004.

Honours

Club 
 Djurgården/Älvsjö 
 Damallsvenskan: 2004

References

External links
 
 
 
 Profile  at Swedish Football Association (SvFF)

Belgian women's footballers
Djurgårdens IF Fotboll (women) players
1980 births
Living people
Women's association football midfielders
Marijke Callebaut
Expatriate women's footballers in Iceland
Belgian expatriates in Iceland
USL W-League (1995–2015) players
Expatriate women's soccer players in the United States
Belgian expatriate sportspeople in the United States
Damallsvenskan players
Hammarby Fotboll (women) players
Belgian expatriate sportspeople in Sweden
Expatriate women's footballers in Sweden
Belgium women's international footballers
Lindenwood University alumni
People from Dendermonde
RSC Anderlecht (women) players
Club Brugge KV (women) players
Lindenwood Lions women's soccer players
Footballers from East Flanders